The 2020–21 Lipscomb Bisons men's basketball team represented Lipscomb University in the 2020–21 NCAA Division I men's basketball season. The Bisons, led by 2nd-year head coach Lennie Acuff, played their home games at the Allen Arena in Nashville, Tennessee as members of the Atlantic Sun Conference. They finished the season 15-12, 9-6 in ASUN Play to finish in 3rd place. They lost in the quarterfinals of the ASUN tournament to Florida Gulf Coast.

Previous season
The Bisons finished the 2019–20 season 16–16, 9–7 in ASUN play to finish in a tie for third place. In the quarterfinals of the ASUN tournament, the #3 seeded Bisons defeated the #6 seed Florida Gulf Coast, 68–63, advancing to the semifinals, where they matched up against the #2 seed North Florida, winning 73–71, advancing to the ASUN championship game. In a rematch of the previous year's title game, the Bisons faced top seeded Liberty, ultimately falling 57–73, for the second consecutive year.

Roster

Schedule and results

|-
!colspan=12 style=| Regular season

|-
!colspan=12 style=| Atlantic Sun tournament
|-

|-

Sources

References

Lipscomb Bisons men's basketball seasons
Lipscomb Bisons
Lipscomb Bisons men's basketball
Lipscomb Bisons men's basketball